Hatzerim Israeli Air Force Base (Basis Heil HaAvir Hatzerim)  is an air base of the Israeli Air Force in the Negev Desert on the west outskirts of Beersheba, near Kibbutz Hatzerim. The base was constructed during the early 1960s and declared operational on 3 October 1966. At Hatzerim is the Israeli Air Force Museum, which opened in 1977 and has allowed public access since June 1991. The IAF Flight Academy has been housed at Hatzerim since April 1966 and the IAF Aerobatic Team is located there as well. Every year, on Israeli independence day the base is opened to the Israeli public to tour.

Units
69 Squadron (Israel) F-15I
102 Squadron (Israel) M-346 Lavi
107 Squadron (Israel) F-16I

History 
Hatzerim Airbase was constructed during the early 1960s and declared operational on 3 October 1966. The base was built on the order of the Israeli Air Force Commander, Ezer Weizmann and was designed by the architect Yitzhak Moore. The first commander of the base was Yosef Alon. It was the first Air Force base built from the ground up, as a new base for the Israeli Air Force, and not on existed base areas of the Royal Air Force.

Commanders

Colonel "Joe" Yosef Alon (first commander and founder) (1966-1970)
Colonel Yeshayahu Bareket (1970-1973)
Colonel Amichai Shmueli (1973-1977)
Yaakov Turner (1977-1981)
Brigadier General Asher Snir (1981-1983)
Brigadier General Ron Huldai
Brigadier General Amiram Elyasaf
Brigadier General Amos Yadlin (1995-1998)
Brigadier General Roni Falec (1998-2001)
Brigadier General Yohanan Lucker (2001-2004)
Brigadier General Shelly Gutman (2004-2007)
Brigadier General Haggai Topolansky (2008-2010)	
Brigadier General Ziv Levi (2010-2012)
Brigadier General Tal Kalman (2012-2014)
Brigadier General Nir Barkan (2014-2015)
Brigadier General Avshalom Amosy (2015-2018)
Brigadier General Aviad Dagan (2018-)

See also
List of airports in Israel

References
Hatzerim on globalsecurity.org

External links
Hatzerim Israel Airforce Museum (Hebrew)

Israeli Air Force bases